"Daffodils" is a song recorded by British record producer Mark Ronson, with vocals from Australian singer Kevin Parker better known by the stage name Tame Impala, for Ronson's fourth studio album, Uptown Special (2015), released as the album's second single. It was officially released to adult album alternative radio in the United States on 4 February 2015.

Music video 
The official audio for the single was uploaded to Vevo on 22 December 2014. An official music video was premiered on 10 February 2016, featuring model Sarah McDaniel. The music video was directed by Theo Wenner and it includes the song "Summer Breaking" along with "Daffodils".

Personnel 

Musicians
 Kevin Parker – vocals, guitars, bass, keys
 Mark Ronson – keys, percussion
 Jeff Bhasker – keys
 James Ford – keys, analogue sequencer
 Riton – analogue sequencer
 Kirin J. Callinan – guitar
 Carlos Alomar – guitar
 Steve Jordan – "silky disco" hi-hat

Production
 Mark Ronson – production, engineering
 Jeff Bhasker – production, engineering
 James Ford – additional production, engineering
 Riton – additional production
 Boo Mitchell – engineering
 Artie Smith – engineering
 Josh Blair – engineering
 Riccardo Damian – engineering
 Tom Elmhirst – mixing
 Joe Visciano – mixing assistance
 Tom Coyne – mastering

Charts

Weekly charts

References

2015 singles
2015 songs
Mark Ronson songs
Songs written by Kevin Parker (musician)
Song recordings produced by Mark Ronson
RCA Records singles